Kjetil Knutsen (born 2 October 1968) is a Norwegian football coach who currently manages FK Bodø/Glimt in Eliteserien.

Knutsen started his manager career at fifth tier club TIL Hovding in 1995, initially as a junior coach, then as head coach. Knutsen would take the team up two divisions in nine years before leaving for a role at top tier side Brann as head of first team development. He was hired as head coach at Fyllingsdalen in 2012 and then at Åsane in 2014. After Knutsen was sacked from his position as head coach in Åsane, he joined Bodø/Glimt as assistant coach under head coach Aasmund Bjørkan. In 2018, Knutsen became head coach for Bodø/Glimt after Bjørkan became sports director. They finished the 2019 Eliteserien in second place, and Knutsen received the Eliteserien Coach of the Year award for this accomplishment.

In 2020 he led Bodø/Glimt to their first ever Norwegian national league title, in a record-breaking season where they lost only one game.
In 2021 he led Bodø/Glimt to their second Eliteserien title following a 3–0 win over Mjøndalen.

In 2021, he led Bodø/Glimt to the club's first group stage in Europe, where his outfit became the first team in history to score six times against a José Mourinho side in a 6–1 victory against Roma at Aspmyra.

Managerial statistics

Honours
Bodø/Glimt
Eliteserien: 2020, 2021

Individual
Eliteserien Coach of the Year: 2019, 2020, 2021

References

1968 births
Living people
Footballers from Bergen
Norwegian footballers
SK Brann players
Norwegian football managers
SK Brann non-playing staff
Åsane Fotball managers
FK Bodø/Glimt managers
Eliteserien managers
Association footballers not categorized by position
FK Bodø/Glimt non-playing staff